Bailey's Point is a Canadian hamlet in the province of Newfoundland and Labrador.

It is located on the western arm of Bonne Bay.

See also
List of communities in Newfoundland and Labrador

Populated coastal places in Canada
Populated places in Newfoundland and Labrador